Our Russia. Balls of Fate is a 2011 Russian comedy film directed by Gleb Orlov and Maksim Pezhemsky. It is the continuation of the sketch-comedy series Our Russia. The film was the highest-grossing film of 2010 in Russia with $22.2 million in ticket sales.

Plot
The story begins with Viktor Marianovich Ryabushkin, the richest billionaire in Moscow. He had the Golden Balls of Genghis Khan, which brought him wealth and power. He would show them to his family and friends but after that, he killed them so that they would not tell anyone his secret. After he murdered them all, he decided to make repairs since the traces of bullets damaged the walls in the house. Brigadier Leonid receives an order to repair the apartment.

Ravshan and Dzhamshut again come to Moscow for repairs in Marjanovic's apartment. Once there, migrant workers tear down and ruin expensive interior items and find the hiding place with the Golden Balls of Genghis Khan. Hearing on the TV about an accident with a minibus, they think that their boss is in trouble and start looking for him around the city. They manage to lose his money in a lottery, but having stolen a car from the casino, they visit the corporation of another oligarch, Oleg Robertovich, and destroy the career of Nikolai Baskov. Later they came to the Sklifosovsky Institute, bury the skeleton with the chief's clothes and fight against the "zombie boss", defeat Victor Marjanovich, get the Balls of Fate and return.

Cast
Sergei Svetlakov - Leonid, "boss" / Ivan Dulin the gay / Siphon the homeless / Slavik the teenager / Snezhana Denisovna the teacher / Inspector of the traffic police Laptev / Sergei Yuryevich Belyakov
Mikhail Galustyan - Ravshan / Beard the homeless / Dimon the teenager / Alyona
Valeriy Magdiash - Jamshut
Viktor Verzhbitsky - Victor Marjanovich Ryabushkin
Alexander Semchev - Bison

Tajikistan ban
The film is banned in Tajikistan.

References

External links

Russian parody films
2010s parody films
Films shot in Moscow
2010 comedy films
2010 films